No Man's Woman may refer to:

 No Man's Woman (album), 2007 tribute album to female musicians
 "No Man's Woman" (song), 2000 song by Sinéad O'Connor 
 No Man's Woman (1953 film), Swedish film
 No Man's Woman (1955 film), American film